A.nnotate  is a web service for storing and annotating documents. Documents are either uploaded by the user or fetched from a web address supplied by the user. Uploads are accepted as PDF, Microsoft Word, office formats supported by OpenOffice and common image formats. When a URL of a web page is entered, the service makes a local copy of the HTML and stylesheet. The service offers a browser bookmarklet to facilitate making snapshots of web pages.

Uploaded documents are rendered as images on the server and the images are sent to the user's browser for display and annotation. Annotation with regions and arrows is supported for all documents. For text documents, the server also
sends the positions of words on the page allowing the client to offer text search and highlighting. Annotations can
be displayed in the right-hand margin, as floating boxes above the text, or as footnotes. For web snapshots they can also be displayed within the main text flow.

By default, all documents and annotations are private. A user can issue invitations by email to allow other users to
view and annotate a particular document or to access all documents in a folder. A "reply" option on annotations allows
other users to comment on existing annotations offering a form of Threaded discussion. Access controls allow the document owner to specify what annotators may do, including viewing each other's annotations and defining new tags.

A.nnotate development

Early development of A.nnotate was enabled by proof-of-concept funding to Textensor Limited,
from the Scottish Government for a project on authoring structured content from text
.
The resulting software, "Notate" is described in a white paper from 2007
which included support for semantic web authoring.

In 2008 the company started selling standalone versions of the system for installation on local hardware and developed an
API allowing web application developers and systems integrators to add annotation capabilities to existing document management systems. It offers off the shelf modules for integration with Documentum and Moodle.

File formats and requirements

Documents are accepted as PDF, Microsoft Office formats, ODF formats and images as PNG, JPEG and GIF.
The client browser requires javascript and cookies to be enabled. A.nnotate can be used with
Firefox, Internet Explorer (versions 6, 7, and 8), Safari  or Google chrome

Reviews

The first release received positive coverage from many bloggers, e.g.:
"I have yet to find the perfect online collaboration tool. A.nnotate is a service that gets as close as anything I've found on the Web." on makeuseof.com

CNET calls it a "real fun annotation tool (at least fun compared to Microsoft Word)"

LifeHacker discusses its uses for peer review; KillerStartups says it seems "very easy to use"

Rev2.org notes that to date "annotations ... haven't really taken off"

and wonders if A.nnotate can finally bring document annotation to life.
BNet.com business tips notes that A.nnotate is a better for online privacy with sharing documents than Google Docs.

The Library 2.0 blog notes that it could be very useful in education for marking assignments, but considers pricing a possible drawback as the free version limits the number of documents you can upload

See also
Web annotation
List of PDF software

References

Note-taking software
QDA software
Social bookmarking